The Green Book is a short book setting out the political philosophy of Libyan leader Muammar Gaddafi. The book was first published in 1975. It is said to have been inspired in part by The Little Red Book (Quotations from Chairman Mao Tse-tung). Both were widely distributed both inside and outside their country of origin, and "written in a simple, understandable style with many memorable slogans". An English translation was issued by the Libyan People's Committee, and a bilingual English/Arabic edition was issued in London by Martin, Brian & O'Keeffe in 1976. During the Libyan Civil War, copies of the book were burned by anti-Gaddafi demonstrators.

Influence

In Libya 
According to British author and former Greater London Council member George Tremlett, Libyan children spent two hours a week studying the book as part of their curriculum. Extracts were broadcast every day on television and radio. Its slogans were also found on billboards and painted on buildings in Libya.

International 
By 1993 lectures and seminars on The Green Book had been held at universities and colleges in France, Eastern Europe, Colombia, and Venezuela.

On a state visit to Libya in 2008, socialist Bolivian President Evo Morales cited the Green Book as a major influence on his political beliefs and policies.

Contents
The Green Book consists of three parts and has 110 pages.
 The Solution of the Problem of Democracy: The Authority of the People (published in late 1975)
 The Solution of the Economic Problem: Socialism (published in early 1977)
 The Social Basis of the Third International Theory (published in September 1981)

Views 
The Green Book rejects both capitalism and communism, as well as representative democracy. Instead, it proposes a type of direct democracy overseen by the General People's Committee which allows direct political participation for all adult citizens.

The book states that "Freedom of expression is the natural right of every person, even if they choose to behave irrationally, to express his or her insanity." The Green Book states that freedom of speech is based upon public ownership of book publishers, newspapers, television, and radio stations, on the grounds that private ownership would be undemocratic.

A paragraph in the book about abolishing money is similar to a paragraph in Friedrich Engels' Principles of Communism. Gaddafi wrote: "The final step is when the new socialist society reaches the stage where profit and money disappear. It is through transforming society into a fully productive society, and through reaching in production a level where the material needs of the members of society are satisfied. On that final stage, profit will automatically disappear and there will be no need for money."

Summary

The following table gives a chapter-by-chapter summary of the book.

Reception

George Tremlett has called the resulting media dull and lacking in a clash of ideas. Dartmouth College Professor Dirk Vandewalle describes the book as more a collection of aphorisms than a systematic argument. U.S. Ambassador David Mack called the book quite jumbled, with various ideas including "a fair amount of xenophobia" wrapped up in "strange mixture".

Writing for the British Broadcasting Corporation, the journalist Martin Asser described the book as follows: "The theory claims to solve the contradictions inherent in capitalism and communism... In fact, it is little more than a series of fatuous diatribes, and it is bitterly ironic that a text whose professed objective is to break the shackles... has been used instead to subjugate an entire population."

The book caused a scandal in 1987, when West German ice hockey club ECD Iserlohn, led by Heinz Weifenbach, signed a US$900,000 advertising deal for the book.

On a 2008 visit to Libya it was reported by Libyan state media that Bolivian President Evo Morales remarked "I read the Green Book, studied it and I am enthusiastic about the thinking spelled out in the Green Book".

See also 
Arab socialism
Indoctrination
Islamic socialism
Jamahiriya
Quotations from Chairman Mao Tse-tung
Ruhnama
Secular religion

References

External links

WorldCat: Formats and editions of The Green Book
OpenAnthropology.org: The Green Book (pdf file)
The Green Book in the original Arabic (pdf file)

1975 non-fiction books
Books by Muammar Gaddafi
Libyan literature
History of Libya under Muammar Gaddafi
Islamism in Libya
Islamist works
Political books
Political manifestos
Politics of Libya
Propaganda books and pamphlets
Socialism in Libya